Wyoming Highway 212 (WYO 212) is a  state highway in Wyoming. It is locally known as Four Mile Road from Wyoming Highway 219 to East Four Mile Road intersection at the curve, and College Drive from US 85/I-25 BUS. SR 212 acts like a bypass of Cheyenne, but in some portions it sneaks into the city limits. The portions that the bypass enters the city limits are between the railroad tracks and Ranchettes, and the northern terminus. SR 212 is signed north–south.

Route description
Wyoming Highway 212 begins at its southern end at Interstate 25 (Exit 7) and travels east and north around Cheyenne to Wyoming Highway 219 (Old Yellowstone Highway) north of Cheyenne. Beginning at I-25, Wyoming Highway 212 runs concurrent with Business Loop I-25 and US 87 Business until an intersection with South Greeley Highway (US 85). After that intersection, WYO 212 passes Laramie County Community College and turns northward toward Interstate 80. WYO 212 intersects Fox Farm Road (former Wyoming Highway 221) at  before heading north to an interchange with I-80. Between the Interstate 80 interchange and US 30 (Lincolnway), Wyoming Highway 212 runs concurrent with Business Loop I-80. After intersecting US 30, WYO 212 heads north and intersects busy Dell Range Blvd. which is a busy commercial strip for shopping and stores. WYO 212 then heads north and west around Cheyenne, taking on the name Four Mile Road.

In the Ranchettes, at the intersection of Four Mile Road and WYO 219 (Yellowstone Road), WYO 212 approaches its northern end. WYO 212 ends at Hynds Boulevard, in front of I-25.

Major intersections

See also

References

External links 

Cheyenne @ AARoads.com
Wyoming State Routes 200-299
WYO 212 - I-25/I-25 Bus/US 87/US 87 Bus to WYO 219/Hynds Blvd (see Wyoming 212)

212
212
Transportation in Laramie County, Wyoming